Innaarsuit Island (old spelling: Ivnârssuit) is an island in the Avannaata municipality in northwestern Greenland, home to the Innaarsuit settlement.

Geography 
Innaarsuit Island is located in the outer belt of islands in Tasiusaq Bay, in the south-central part of Upernavik Archipelago. In the north, it is separated from sibling Ateqanngitsorsuaq Island by a very narrow channel. The inner waterways of Tasiusaq Bay separate it from the small Naajaat Island in the east, and from Qaarsorsuatsiaq Island in the west. Several skerries buffer the southern coast of the island.

The coastline of Innaarsuit Island is developed, with several small inlets indenting the shore in the east, west, and northwest. The Innaarsuit settlement is located near the mouth of one of the inlets, in the northwestern part of the island. The island is nearly split in half in the center, with only a narrow isthmus joining the southern and northern halves.

References

Tasiusaq Bay
Islands of the Upernavik Archipelago